An American Girl Story – Melody 1963: Love Has to Win is a 2016 American drama film starring Marsai Martin in the title role, alongside Frances Fisher, Idara Victor and Frankie Faison in supporting roles. Set in Detroit, Michigan during the Civil Rights Movement, the film revolves around African-American girl Melody Ellison, as she faces adversity and discrimination in her hometown and learns to overcome it through her creativity and imagination.

The film is the first in the American Girl film series to be released exclusively on an online streaming service, and is Amazon Studios' first original special. Love Has to Win is also the first Historical/BeForever feature since the 2008 theatrical release Kit Kittredge: An American Girl. Common served as the executive producer in the film.

Plot
Set in 1963, the film revolves around Melody Ellison, an African-American girl living in Detroit, Michigan with her mother Frances and her grandfather Frank. Early on she and her family face racial inequality in their hometown, with Melody being bullied at school by a white student named Donald along with his friends for her ethnicity, or wrongfully accused of shoplifting at a clothing store where Melody's mother works.

A turning point for Melody was when a fellow student expresses her intention of moving to another school out of fear for being discriminated, and when news about the 16th Street Baptist Church bombing was aired on television, making her question the Pledge of Allegiance and consider moving to a school at her neighborhood. Fearing that a similar bombing would take place at the chapel where Melody's family attend mass in, Melody tries to convince her mother not to perform at a fundraising concert for the Birmingham victims; Frances reassures her, and sees hope in her daughter. Melody puts her creative skill at clothing design to good use, upcycling an old garment into a shawl for her mother to wear at her piano performance.

At church she meets her teacher Miss Abbot, who brought the other students along as part of a field trip. Donald walks out as he refuses to take Melody's hand; Melody's best friend Tricia volunteers to hold her hand instead. The concert takes place as planned. The film ends with Melody and the rest of the churchgoers performing "Lift Every Voice and Sing". A short tribute to the four young victims of the Birmingham bombing appears in a post-credits sequence.

Cast
Starring
 Marsai Martin as Melody Ellison
 Idara Victor as Frances Ellison
 Frances Fisher as Miss Abbot
 Frankie Faison as Frank Ellison

Supporting cast

 Garrett McQuaid as Donald
 Dara Iruka as Lorraine
 Lola Wayne Villa as Trica
 Matthew Foster as Principal Davis
 Briana Lane as Sales Clerk aka Val
 Chuck McCollum as Store Manager
 Rocky McMurray as Mr. Schuler
 Daija Bickham as Neighborhood Girl #1
 Skyelar Wesley as Neighborhood Girl #2
 Libby Ewing as Mother in Store
 Joelle Better as Daughter in Store

Release
The direct-to-video film was released to Amazon Prime subscribers on October 21, 2016.

See also
Civil rights movement in popular culture

References

External links
 

Melody 1963: Love Has to Win
American children's films
Civil rights movement in film
2010s English-language films
Films about bullying
Films about music and musicians
Films about prejudice
Films about race and ethnicity
Films about racism
Films based on American novels
Films based on toys
Films set in the 1960s
Films set in 1963
Films set in Detroit
Parodies of Donald Trump
2010s American films